Altin Sufa (born 20 July 1988, in Kavajë) is an Albanian cyclist who last rode for . Considered one of the top cyclists in the country, he has been a member of the Albania national cycling team since 2008.

References

External links

Sportspeople from Kavajë
Albanian male cyclists
1988 births
Living people